Dušan Meško  (born 7 May 1956, in Martin), Slovakia, is a Slovak physician, writer and university professor. He specializes in sports medicine.

Career
A graduate of the Jessenius School of Medicine in Martin, Meško has since 1981 been employed there as an internist. He has since 2002 been the head of the Department of Sports Medicine at the Martin University Hospital. He is a member of several professional societies and committees since 2008 he has been chief expert of the Ministry of Health of the Slovak Republic for the Department of Sports Medicine. Since February 2011, he has held the post of vice-rector of the Comenius University in Bratislava for science, research and doctoral studies.

Bibliography
1998: Mesko, Dusan: Vademékum klinickej biochémie (English: Vademecum of Clinical Biochemistry) 
2003: Mesko, Dusan: Differential Diagnosis by Laboratory Medicine (Slovak: Diferenciálna diagnostika pomocou laboratórnej medicíny) 
2004: Mesko, Dusan: Akademická příručka 
2005: Mesko, Dusan: Akademická príručka 2. upravené a doplnené vydanie 
2005: Mesko, Dusan  Telovýchovnolekárske vademecum

References

External links
 Mesko's blog

Living people
1956 births
Slovak sports physicians
Academic staff of Comenius University
Comenius University alumni
Slovak scientists
People from Martin, Slovakia
Slovak writers